Jonathan Giles (born 8 January 1988) is a former professional Australian rules footballer who played for the Greater Western Sydney Giants, Essendon Football Club and West Coast Eagles in the Australian Football League (AFL). He was listed with the Port Adelaide Football Club from 2006 to 2009, but did not play a senior game for the club. He returned to the AFL with expansion club , making his debut in round of the 2012 season. Giles moved on to Essendon for the 2015 season, and then spent two years with West Coast before retiring due to a degenerative knee condition. In total, he played 63 AFL games.

AFL career

Port Adelaide (2006–09)
Giles was recruited in the 2005 AFL Draft, from Central District in the South Australian National Football League (SANFL) at pick number 70, but never played a game for Port Adelaide in the AFL.

During the 2006 season, he played 19 games for Central District's reserves team, kicking four goals. Also in 2006, Giles played in the London exhibition match against Geelong. In a spiteful match, he kicked one goal.

Giles was delisted by Port on 16 October 2009. In December 2010, after winning the best and fairest award for Sturt in the SANFL, Giles was selected by the new Greater Western Sydney Giants in the 2011 Rookie Draft.

Greater Western Sydney (2012–14)
Giles played the 2011 season for Greater Western Sydney in the North East Australian Football League, as one of the senior players on an otherwise young squad. He played his first official AFL game against the Sydney Swans where he kicked one goal. In Round 8, 2014, Giles became the first Giants player to notch up 50 games for the club, the Giants lost to the West Coast Eagles by 111 points.

Essendon (2015)
On 16 October 2014, Giles was traded to the Essendon Football Club after struggling to maintain his place in the Greater Western Sydney team throughout the 2014 season. In round 18 in the 2015 season, Giles made his debut for Essendon in an 87-point loss to the Western Bulldogs.

West Coast (2016)
In October 2015, Giles was traded to the West Coast Eagles.

As of the end of the 2016 season, Giles has the lowest winning percentage for any current player in the AFL, playing in only eight wins from 58 career games.

Giles managed five more games during the 2017 season, due to injuries to first-choice ruckmen Nic Naitanui and Scott Lycett. He retired at the end of the season due to a degenerative knee condition.

Statistics
Statistics are correct to the end of the 2017 season

|- style="background-color: #EAEAEA"
! scope="row" style="text-align:center" | 2012
|
| 26 || 20 || 18 || 8 || 177 || 108 || 285 || 70 || 43 || 442 || 0.9 || 0.4 || 8.9 || 5.4 || 14.3 || 3.5 || 2.2 || 22.1
|- 
! scope="row" style="text-align:center" | 2013
|
| 26 || 22 || 14 || 6 || 160 || 71 || 231 || 30 || 46 || 535 || 0.6 || 0.3 || 7.3 || 3.2 || 10.5 || 1.4 || 2.1 || 24.3
|- style="background-color: #EAEAEA"
! scope="row" style="text-align:center" | 2014
|
| 26 || 9 || 7 || 4 || 53 || 22 || 75 || 8 || 24 || 213 || 0.8 || 0.4 || 5.9 || 2.4 || 8.3 || 0.9 || 2.7 || 23.7
|- 
! scope="row" style="text-align:center" | 2015
|
| 27 || 3 || 1 || 2 || 27 || 9 || 36 || 5 || 7 || 67 || 0.3 || 0.7 || 9.0 || 3.0 || 12.0 || 1.7 || 2.3 || 22.3
|- style="background-color: #EAEAEA"
! scope="row" style="text-align:center" | 2016
|
| 22 || 4 || 2 || 1 || 21 || 14 || 35 || 10 || 10 || 92 || 0.5 || 0.3 || 5.3 || 3.5 || 8.8 || 2.5 || 2.5 || 23.0
|- 
! scope="row" style="text-align:center" | 2017
|
| 22 || 5 || 1 || 2 || 19 || 20 || 39 || 6 || 15 || 109 || 0.2 || 0.4 || 3.8 || 4.0 || 7.8 || 1.2 || 3.0 || 21.8
|- class="sortbottom"
! colspan=3| Career
! 63
! 43
! 23
! 457
! 244
! 701
! 129
! 145
! 1458
! 0.7
! 0.4
! 7.3
! 3.9
! 11.1
! 2.0
! 2.3
! 23.1
|}

References

External links

Living people
1988 births
Central District Football Club players
Sturt Football Club players
Greater Western Sydney Giants players
Australian rules footballers from Adelaide
Essendon Football Club players
East Perth Football Club players
West Coast Eagles players